The 2002 Pontiac Excitement 400 was the 11th stock car race of the 2002 NASCAR Winston Cup Series and the 48th iteration of the event. The race was held throughout the days of May 4-5, 2002 due to rain forcing the delay of the race from its scheduled Sunday date. The race was held in Richmond, Virginia, at Richmond International Raceway, a 0.75 miles (1.21 km) D-shaped oval. The race took the scheduled 400 laps to complete. At race's end, Tony Stewart, driving for Joe Gibbs Racing, would win a crash-marred and wild race after taking control of the final restart with 18 to go. The win was Stewart's 14th career NASCAR Winston Cup Series win and his second of the season. To fill out the podium, Ryan Newman of Penske Racing and Jeff Burton of Roush Racing would finish second and third, respectively.

Background 

Richmond International Raceway (RIR) is a 3/4-mile (1.2 km), D-shaped, asphalt race track located just outside Richmond, Virginia in Henrico County. It hosts the Monster Energy NASCAR Cup Series and Xfinity Series. Known as "America's premier short track", it formerly hosted a NASCAR Camping World Truck Series race, an IndyCar Series race, and two USAC sprint car races.

Entry list 

 (R) denotes rookie driver.

*Driver changed to Joe Nemechek for the race, as Benson Jr. had suffered injuries during the 2002 Hardee's 250, the preliminary Busch race.

Practice

First practice 
The first practice session was held on Friday, May 3, at 11:20 AM EST, and would last for two hours.

During the session, Dale Jarrett and Kurt Busch would both crash in separate incidents.

Second practice 
The second practice session was held on Friday, May 3, at 4:45 PM EST, and would last for 45 minutes.

Third and final practice 
The third and final practice session, sometimes referred to as Happy Hour, was held on Friday, May 3, at 6:15 PM EST, and would last for 45 minutes.

Qualifying 
Qualifying was held on Friday, May 3, at 3:05 PM EST. Each driver would have two laps to set a fastest time; the fastest of the two would count as their official qualifying lap. Positions 1-36 would be decided on time, while positions 37-43 would be based on provisionals. Six spots are awarded by the use of provisionals based on owner's points. The seventh is awarded to a past champion who has not otherwise qualified for the race. If no past champ needs the provisional, the next team in the owner points will be awarded a provisional.

Kevin Grubb was the only driver to fail to qualify.

Full qualifying results

Race results

References 

2002 NASCAR Winston Cup Series
NASCAR races at Richmond Raceway
May 2002 sports events in the United States
2002 in sports in Virginia